George William Sarbacher Jr. (September 30, 1919 – March 4, 1973) was a Republican member of the U.S. House of Representatives from Pennsylvania.

George Sarbacher was born in Philadelphia, Pennsylvania.  He graduated from Temple University in 1942.  He enlisted in the United States Marine Corps and served from January 1942 to January 1947.  He was commissioned a lieutenant and later a captain and served overseas in the Southwest Pacific for two and a half years.

While serving on active duty was elected to Congress.  He was elected in 1946 as a Republican to the 80th Congress.  He was an unsuccessful candidate for reelection in 1948 and 1950.  After his term in Congress, he became director of highway safety for Pennsylvania.  He was president and chairman of board of directors of the National Scientific Laboratories, Inc. in Washington, D.C., and NSL Electronics, Ltd. in Hamilton, Ontario, Canada.  At the time of his death, he was serving as chairman of the Postal Service management advisory team.

Sources

1919 births
1973 deaths
United States Marine Corps personnel of World War II
Military personnel from Pennsylvania
Republican Party members of the United States House of Representatives from Pennsylvania
20th-century American politicians
United States Marine Corps officers